Saurogobio xiangjiangensis is a species of cyprinid fish found in China.

References

Saurogobio
Fish described in 1980